A bankers' bank is a financial institution that provides financial services to community banks in the United States of America. Bankers' banks are owned by investor banks and may provide services only to community banks.

By leveraging positive economies of scale, bankers' banks are able to provide many services to community banks that typically would be economically available only to large national or multinational banks.  The advantage here is that community banks which use these services can in turn offer them to their customers, allowing these smaller independent banks to effectively compete with larger banks.

The nation's first bankers' bank, United Bankers' Bank was formed in Minnesota in 1975.  Currently there are 12 bankers' banks across the US serving more than 6,000 banks in 48 states.  The largest bankers' bank is at present TIB-The Independent BankersBank, located in Farmers Branch, TX, and serving over 1,800 banks.

See also

 Bank
Corporate credit union
Credit union

Community banking
Banks